Edmund Pang Ho-cheung is a Hong Kong film director, screenwriter, producer, and novelist.

Early life
Pang was born in Hong Kong in 1973. At the age of 15, he started using a video camera to direct short films with his elder brother.

After graduating from high school, he studied abroad in Taiwan for half a year, before returning to Hong Kong, where he worked for Hong Kong Asian Television Limited as a gag show writer. He later wrote his first novel, and served as a columnist for various newspapers and magazines.

Career
In 1997, at the age of 24, Pang began 18 months of research for his first novel, Fulltime Killer. The novel went on to become extremely popular, selling more than 100,000 copies in Hong Kong. It was then reworked as a radio program. Johnnie To adapted the novel into a feature film starring Andy Lau in 2001.

While Pang was still a television and radio host, he decided to fulfill his dream of being a film director. 

Pang made his feature length debut with You Shoot, I Shoot (2001).

His feature film Love in the Buff opened the 36th Hong Kong International Film Festival, in March 2012. The film is a sequel to the successful romance Love in a Puff.  Both star Miriam Yeung  and Shawn Yue Man-lok. The films have been likened to Hong Kong's version of the Before trilogy.

In February 2019, it was reported that Pang was going to write, direct, and produce a film trilogy based on Jin Yong's wuxia novel The Deer and the Cauldron through Pang's Making Films Production company. Each film was slated to receive an $80 million dollar budget.

Style and themes 
Pang has been deemed one of Hong Kong cinema's most recognizable directors. However, he is uncomfortable with being categorized as a "Hong Kong director" as he believes the attribution does not fully capture the full range of films within the industry.

Muse magazine film critic Perry Lam has praised Pang for 'often demonstrat[ing] a Kafkaesque talent for seeing the absurd in the mundane realities of everyday life.'

Personal and political views 
In 2019, actor and pro-democracy supporter Chapman To posted online that he would be cutting all ties with former collaborator Pang Ho-cheung, over the director's condemnation of anti-extradition bill protests in Hong Kong.

Personal life 
Pang is married to producer Subi Liang. In 2021, Pang was rumored to have moved to Canada with his wife, over frustrations surrounding mainland Chinese censorship laws.

Filmography

Producer
 指甲刀人魔 (short film) (2010)
 假戏真做 (short film) (2010)
 谎言大作战 (short film) (2010)
 爱在微博蔓延时 (short film) (2010)

Novelist
 Fulltime Killer (2001)

Actor
 Mysterious Story I: Please Come Back (1999)     
 The Faterangers (1999)     
 You Shoot, I Shoot (2001)
 Leaving in Sorrow (2001)     
 Men Suddenly in Black (2003)

References

External links
 Official Website
 An Interview with Edmond Pang Ho Cheung
 Edmond Pang Ho-Cheung at the Hong Kong Movie Database
 Hong Kong Movie World
 

Living people
1973 births
Hong Kong people
Hong Kong film directors
Hong Kong film producers
Hong Kong male film actors
Hong Kong writers
Hong Kong screenwriters
Hong Kong novelists
Hong Kong dramatists and playwrights